The Financial Services Commission (FSC), formerly Financial Supervisory Commission, is South Korean government's top financial regulator. It makes financial policies, and directs the Financial Supervisory Service.

The Financial Supervisory Commission was established in 1998. With the start of Lee Myung-bak administration, the Commission was rearranged into the Financial Services Commission; the new one took over the policy-making authority from the Finance Ministry.

As part of social responsibility, in 2014 the FSC Chairman Shin Je-yoo made plans to regulate the degree of innovativeness of banks requiring them to make the public the wages employees and executives in comparison to overall profit.

This part of measured to encourage financial banks to create more value and jobs with an innovative management. It will see whether the banks are financing enough promising tech firms for going conservative practices and filling their social responsibility.

References

See also
Korea Financial Investment Association
Financial Supervisory Service
Bank of Korea

Financial services companies established in 2008
Korea, South
Government agencies of South Korea
Financial Services Commission